Mayer State Park is a state park in the Columbia River Gorge, near Rowena, Oregon in Wasco County in the U.S. state of Oregon. It consists of several disjointed parcels of transected by Interstate 84 and the tracks of the Union Pacific Railroad.

The south-easternmost parcel includes the Rowena Loops, a series of horseshoe curves by which the Historic Columbia River Highway (U.S. Route 30) climbs to the Rowena Crest, where there is an overlook, from the community of Rowena.

References

External links

 

State parks of Oregon
Columbia River Gorge
Historic Columbia River Highway
Parks in Wasco County, Oregon